The Principality of Minsk was an appanage principality of the Principality of Polotsk and centered on the city of Minsk (today in Belarus). It existed from its founding in 1101 until it was nominally annexed by the Grand Duchy of Lithuania in 1242, and then fell under de facto annexation in 1326.

Geography 

The principality originally occupied territories around the Drut, Svislach and Berezina river basins. Besides the capital city of Minsk, other population centers in the principality included Barysaw, Lahojsk, Zaslawye, Orsha and the historical town of Drutsk.

History 

The area around Minsk was controlled by the Principality of Polotsk beginning from the 10th century. Following the death of Vseslav of Polotsk in 1101, Polotsk was divided into six smaller principalities each to be inherited by one of his six surviving sons. Vseslav's second born son, Gleb Vseslavich inherited the lands surrounding Minsk and started the Minsk branch of the princes of Polotsk.

Almost immediately following his father's death, Gleb Vseslavich started a war against his brothers Davyd, prince of Polotsk and Roman, prince of Drutsk to expand his territory. In 1106, he had partaken in a raid against the Baltic tribes in Semigallia. In 1116, he started a war with Vladimir II of the Principality of Kiev and burned the town of Slutsk to the ground. In retaliation, Vladimir marched towards Minsk and laid a two-month siege which was at first unsuccessful but Vladimir wanted to continue the siege following the winter season. Gleb Vseslavich upon seeing the preparations for a long siege, sent peace envoys to the enemy camp and agreed to a peace treaty on the condition of good behavior on his part. Completely ignoring the peace treaty, Gleb resumed his hostilities and in 1117, attacked Smolensk. In retaliation, Vladimir II sent his son Mstislav to Minsk with a large army. He besieged and took Minsk, and brought Gleb to Kiev as prisoner, where he died in 1119.

Following the death of Gleb Vseslavich, the principality of Minsk fell under Kievan influence. In 1146, Gleb's son, Rostislav Glebovich regained control of Minsk. Rostislav and his descendants would fight wars with the princes of Drutsk and Vitebsk. This period saw the principality's relationship with the Grand Duchy of Lithuania grow, and in 1164, Rostislav's brother, Volodar Glebovich with the help of the Lithuanians, won an important battle against the prince of Polotsk, which affirmed the principalities independence from Polotsk.

In the 13th century, the influence of Lithuanian princes grew and the princes of Minsk were virtually vassals of the Grand Duchy of Lithuania. Minsk escaped the Mongol Invasion of Rus in 1237–1239, however, in later years it was attacked by nomadic invaders from the Golden Horde, who ravaged and vassalized many principalities to the south. Trying to avoid the Tatar Yoke, the Principality of Minsk sought the protection of their Lithuanian allies and in 1242, Minsk was peacefully annexed by the Grand Duchy of Lithuania. In 1249, a combined Minsk and Lithuanian army repelled a Tatar-Mongol invasion.

The city of Minsk oversaw periods of growth and prosperity during Lithuanian reign and many local nobles enjoyed high ranking in the society of the Grand Duchy. For instance, in 1326, a treaty between Grand Duchy of Lithuania and the city of Novgorod was signed for Lithuanian Prince Gediminas by Vasily, the then ruler of Minsk.

In 1413, when the Grand Duchy of Lithuania and the Kingdom of Poland signed the Union of Horodło, the Principality of Minsk ceased to exist and the city became the center of the newly created Minsk Voivodeship.

See also 
 History of Minsk
 Principality of Slutsk

References 

Minsk
Medieval Belarus
Former subdivisions of Lithuania
Former subdivisions of Belarus
Former principalities
Principalities of the Grand Duchy of Lithuania